Carys Creek is a  long tributary to the Little Nottoway River in the United States state of Virginia.  Located in the south-central part of the state, it is part of the larger Chowan-Albemarle drainage.  The watershed is 74% forested and 25% agricultural with the rest of land as other uses. This stream joins with Carys Creek to form the Little Nottoway River.

See also
List of rivers of Virginia

References

Rivers of Virginia
Tributaries of Albemarle Sound